Cabbie claw or Cabelew is a traditional dish from the northeast of Scotland and Orkney. It is traditionally made using speldings, young fish of the family Gadidae, such as cod, haddock or whiting. The name is a derivative of cabillaud, the French name for Cod. The dish of cod served in white sauce with chopped egg white in it.

Preparation
To make it, the cod is cleaned, then rubbed with salt inside and out, then hung outside to dry in the wind for 24 to 48 hours. The cod is then simmered for about half an hour in enough water to cover it, flavoured with horseradish and parsley. Cabbie claw can be prepared in a skillet or in the oven.

Other ingredients include parsley, horseradish and mashed potato.  The sauce is made with butter, flour, milk, hard-boiled eggs, and nutmeg. Alternate versions outside the traditional version's only difference are usually an addition of more spices.

References

External links

Scottish cuisine
Fish dishes
Orcadian culture